Adelpherupa elongalis is a moth in the family Crambidae. It was described by Koen V. N. Maes in 2002. It is found in Angola, the Democratic Republic of the Congo (West Kasai, Katanga), Ethiopia, Kenya, Malawi, Nigeria, Sudan and Uganda.

References

Moths described in 2002
Schoenobiinae
Moths of Africa